Dent's Fountain, also known as the City Hall Fountain, was a fountain in front of the first generation of Hong Kong City Hall (1869 -1933) on Queen's Road Central
in Victoria, Hong Kong. It was donated to the people of Hong Kong by merchant John Dent of Dent & Co. in 1864 but was not installed until the completion of the City Hall in 1869. It was demolished in 1933 due to construction of the third generation Hongkong and Shanghai Banking Corporation Building.

Design

The fountain was located at the centre of the public space in front of the  City Hall on Queen's Road Central, it served as the architectural focal point of the symmetrical facade of the City Hall.

The fountain was built with stucco, the centre had 4 caryatids supporting a basin, on the top of the basin there was a kneeling figure of a child. On the parameter, the fountain area was guarded by 4 couchant stone lions at 4 corners, each facing to the principal points of the compass. A plaques bore an inscription that the fountain was "presented to the Colony by Mr. John Dent in 1864".

See also
List of lost buildings and structures in Hong Kong

References

British Hong Kong
Former buildings and structures in Hong Kong
Central, Hong Kong
Buildings and structures demolished in 1933